The Breithorn Twins are twin peaks of the Breithorn range of the Pennine Alps, located on the border between Switzerland and Italy, between the canton of Valais and the region of Aosta Valley. It is located east of the Theodul Pass.

The twin peaks are called Eastern Breithorn/western Breithorn Twin (4,139 m) and Gendarm/eastern Breithorn Twin (4,109 m).

References

External links
Breithornzwillinge on Hikr

Alpine four-thousanders
Mountains of the Alps
Mountains of Italy
Mountains of Switzerland
Pennine Alps
Italy–Switzerland border
International mountains of Europe
Mountains of Valais
Four-thousanders of Switzerland